Picralima is a plant genus in the family Apocynaceae, first described as a genus in 1896. It contains only one known species, Picralima nitida, native to tropical Africa (Benin, Ghana, Ivory Coast, Nigeria, Gabon, Cameroon, Cabinda, Central African Republic, Republic of Congo, Zaire, Uganda).

Picralima nitida, the akuamma, is a tree. The dried seeds from this plant are used in traditional medicine throughout West Africa, particularly in Ghana as well as in the Ivory Coast and Nigeria. The seeds are crushed or powdered and taken orally, and are mainly used for the treatment of malaria, and diarrhoea, and as a painkiller.  The plant produces the alkaloids pericine and akuammine, among others.

An enterprising Ghanaian hospital started manufacturing and selling standardized 250 mg capsules of the powdered P. nitida seed, which then became a widely used palliative. This then led researchers to try to discover the active component of the seeds.

Picralima nitida seeds contain a complex mixture of alkaloids producing antipyretic and antiinflammatory effects along with analgesia in animal studies. Several of these were shown to bind to opioid receptors with weak affinity in vitro, and two compounds, akuammidine and ψ-akuammigine, were found to be μ-opioid agonists, although not particularly selective. More recently, it has been shown that an additional constitutive analog, acuammicine, has potent activity as a kappa opioid receptor agonist. 

formerly included in genus
 Picralima elliotii (Stapf) Stapf = Hunteria umbellata (K.Schum.) Hallier f.
 Picralima gracilis A.Chev. = Hunteria umbellata (K.Schum.) Hallier f.
 Picralima laurifolia A.Chev. = Hunteria simii (Stapf) H.Huber
 Picralima umbellata (K.Schum.) Stapf = Hunteria umbellata (K.Schum.) Hallier f.

References

External links 
	

 

Flora of Africa
Monotypic Apocynaceae genera
Rauvolfioideae